Acceptance is a 2014 novel by Jeff VanderMeer. It is the last in a series of three books called the Southern Reach Trilogy. It was released in the US on September 2, 2014.

Plot summary
Acceptance jumps around in time and between the perspectives of several characters from the first two novels in the Southern Reach Trilogy.

The Lighthouse Keeper 
In the years before Area X, Saul Evans — the Lighthouse Keeper introduced in Annihilation — builds a friendship with nine-year-old Gloria, the girl who becomes the psychologist of the 12th expedition and the former Director of the Southern Reach. While maintaining the lighthouse (the same one found in Area X), Saul is frustrated by the constant visits of Henry and Suzanne, two members of the Séance & Science Brigade (S&SB) who perform unknown experiments involving the lighthouse's lens. Later, a fire breaks out on nearby Failure Island, destroying S&SB's headquarters. While cleaning the grounds, Saul sees a mysterious flower of light on the floor. As he attempts to pluck it, it stabs his finger. Saul begins to have vivid nightmares: he imagines walking into his lighthouse only to discover it has transformed into the Tower. When he awakens, Saul begins reciting the sermon written by the Crawler on the walls of the Tower. Over time Saul becomes increasingly obsessed with the sermon.

Gloria leaves to be with her father just before Saul returns to the lighthouse at night and sees a glowing light emanating from the trapdoor beside the lens. Saul enters the light. When he awakens, he finds Henry and Suzanne's bodies beside him. However, a doppelgänger of Henry arrives and confronts Saul. The two eventually fall off the side of the lighthouse. Saul survives, but as he attempts to escape, visions of Area X flood his mind. Saul finally stops running, having accepted defeat. A tunnel, later referred to by expedition members as a tower, forms at the site where Saul falls. Saul becomes the Crawler which scrolls the organic words which descend the Tower.

The Psychologist/Director 
The second timeline describes Gloria's initial acceptance into the Southern Reach and her promotion to Director. She has a strained relationship with Lowry, the only survivor of the first expedition and the man responsible for organizing each subsequent journey into Area X. Without alerting anyone at the Southern Reach, Gloria secretly crosses the border into Area X with Whitby. She visits her childhood home, encounters the Crawler in the Tower, and visits the lighthouse. While Whitby is upstairs, he apparently (unseen to the Director) struggles with his duplicate and says that he killed it just before she rushed up to find him bruised and scratched, with no sign of the Dead Whitby. The Director finds a backpack Whitby swears belonged to Dead Whitby containing the cell phone and plant first mentioned in Authority.

Upon her return, the Director refuses to relate her experiences to Lowry. Instead, she begins planning the 12th expedition and interviews the biologist for the mission. It is then revealed that the Director has terminal cancer. She, therefore, decides to join the 12th expedition in the hopes of visiting Area X one last time. The Director also learns that the S&SB may have been involved in the creation of Area X. When she confronts Lowry about this, he refuses to admit it. Finally, the Director pulls out a photo of the cell phone she found in Area X, arguing that it belonged to Lowry and was used to communicate with Area X. The Director believes that Area X is trying to communicate with Lowry because it has been found in such a serendipitous way and considering the strange goings-on surrounding it after it is found. Lowry eventually admits the phone belonged to him and storms off.

The Director's story ends with her embarking on the 12th expedition as the psychologist. In her pocket is a letter to Saul Evans, which she hopes to give him when they meet again. However, as seen in Annihilation, the Director dies before Saul can receive her message: an apology for never returning to the lighthouse as a child, thanks for his friendship and guidance, and a promise always to remember him as the Keeper of the Light.

Control & Ghost Bird 
Control and Ghost Bird enter Area X through a previously unknown portal. They wander in the wilderness before arriving at Failure Island, where they encounter Grace. Grace reveals why Area X grows so quickly: time moves faster inside the border during specific "cosmic" shifts that seem to happen randomly. Although Control and Ghost Bird have only been gone a few weeks, Grace has been waiting on the Island for three years. This also accounts for how some expeditions never return, as they may have been trapped there for years and eventually died. Grace also shows them the biologist's "Last Will and Testament," detailing what happened to her after the events of Annihilation: the biologist arrived at the Island in search of her husband, believing that the man who returned from the 11th expedition was a copy of her husband generated by Area X. The biologist instead encounters an owl which becomes her companion for the next 30 years. The owl behaves strangely compared to typical owl behavior. Over time she comes to believe that the owl is the form that her husband took after he was changed by Area X. She has held off the takeover by the brightness, using pain as a way for her body to resist it, and believes that her eventual change will likely be more radical, perhaps into something like the moaning creature. Eventually, the owl dies, and the brightness that afflicts the biologist swallows her whole.

Grace announces that the biologist is returning to the Island. Ghost Bird — herself a copy of the biologist generated by Area X — encounters her original self, transformed into a staggeringly immense, hyper-sentient, whale-like creature, unbound by physical law and covered with eyes. Control, Ghost Bird, and Grace decided to return to the Tower, where Ghost Bird encounters the Crawler. When she touches it, she sees the birth of Area X as if it is its own universe. Grace shoots at the Crawler and accidentally hits Ghost Bird.

Meanwhile, Control, overcome by the brightness, is transforming into something nonhuman, a loping creature with paws. Maimed by the Crawler and close to death, he descends further into the Tower. As he comes closer to the light at the bottom of the Tower, he realizes that it is the flower that pricked Saul and created Area X. He leaps into the light.

Grace and Ghost Bird exit the Tower and head to the border. Ghost Bird is ambivalent about the possible total expansion of Area X but is mindful of Grace and her connection to others outside of Area X. They find the Southern Reach building abandoned. The two continue walking, unsure if Area X is gone or if the border has expanded even further.

Reception
On March 15, 2014, BuzzFeed gave an exclusive first look at the cover to Acceptance along with an interview with Jeff VanderMeer. Reviews for Acceptance were for the most part favorable. NPR said that the book "is at different times the best haunted lighthouse story ever written, a deeply unsettling tale of first contact, a book about death, a book about obsession and loss, a book about the horrifying experience of confronting an intelligence far greater and far stranger than our own, and a book about sea monsters." The Guardian called it a potent conclusion to the trilogy while Kirkus gave the work a starred review.

During its opening week, Acceptance was ranked as #16 on the New York Times Best Sellers List for Paperback Trade Fiction. The New York Times wrote a full page review calling the book "pure reading pleasure" and added that "VanderMeer has created an immersive and wonderfully realized world."

References

External links

2014 American novels
American science fiction novels
Weird fiction novels
English-language novels
Farrar, Straus and Giroux books